Mimophilorhizus chilensis is a species of beetle in the family Carabidae, the only species in the genus Mimophilorhizus.

References

Lebiinae